Jean Clarice Scholtz is an American computer scientist known for her contributions to human–computer interaction, and particularly for developing the "Common Industry Format" (CIF) for usability test results while at the National Institute of Standards and Technology.

Education and career
Scholtz has a bachelor's degree from the University of Iowa.
She earned a master's degree from the Stevens Institute of Technology, and completed her Ph.D. in 1989 in computer science at the University of Nebraska–Lincoln. Her dissertation was A study of transfer of skill between programming languages, and was jointly supervised by Susan Wiedenbeck and David A. Klarner.

After completing her doctorate, Scholtz became a faculty member at Portland State University, and moved from there to Intel and then the National Institute of Standards and Technology. While at the National Institute of Standards and Technology, she also served as a program manager for the Defense Advanced Research Projects Agency.
Scholtz retired from the National Institute of Standards and Technology in 2006, and became Chief Scientist for Visual Analytics at the Pacific Northwest National Laboratory.

Recognition
SIGCHI gave Scholtz their Lifetime Service Award in 2015.
She was elected to the CHI Academy in 2018.

References

External links

Year of birth missing (living people)
Living people
American computer scientists
American women computer scientists
University of Iowa alumni
Stevens Institute of Technology alumni
University of Nebraska–Lincoln alumni
Portland State University faculty
American women academics
21st-century American women